Elizabeth Stewart may refer to:
Elizabeth Stewart, Countess of Crawford
Elizabeth Stewart, 2nd Countess of Moray
Liz Stewart, U.S. interior designer, actress and model
Betsy Stewart, fictional character on As The World Turns

See also
Elizabeth Stuart (disambiguation)
Eliza Stewart (disambiguation)